Darwinia hypericifolia is a species of flowering plant in the myrtle family Myrtaceae and is endemic to the south-west of Western Australia.

The species was first formally described in 1852 by Nikolai Turczaninow who gave it the name Genetyllis hypericifolia in the Bulletin de la Classe Physico-Mathématique de l'Académie Impériale des Sciences de Saint-Pétersbourg. In 1923, Karel Domin changed the name to Darwinia hypericifolia inVestnik Kralovske Ceske Spolecnosti Nauk, Trida Matematiko-Prirodevedecke.

Darwinia hypericifolia occurs on peaty sand on the slopes of mountains in the Stirling Range in the Esperance Plains bioregion of south-western Western Australia. It is listed as "Priority Four" by the Government of Western Australia Department of Biodiversity, Conservation and Attractions, meaning that it is rare or near threatened.

References

hypericifolia
Endemic flora of Western Australia
Myrtales of Australia
Rosids of Western Australia
Taxa named by Nikolai Turczaninow
Plants described in 1852